Elaphria nucicolora, the sugarcane midget, is a moth of the family Noctuidae. The species was first described by Achille Guenée in 1852. It is found from the south-eastern United States (Florida to North Carolina, west to Texas), through Guadeloupe, Jamaica and Puerto Rico to tropical South America (Peru and French Guiana). It is also present on the Hawaiian islands of Oahu, Maui and Hawaii.

The wingspan is about 21 mm. Adults are on wing from June to November in Georgia and may be present year round in Florida and the tropics.

Larvae have been recorded feeding on watermelon, Emilia flammea, Euphorbia hirta, Portulaca oleracea, Synedrella nodiflora as well as sugarcane. The caterpillar is nearly uniform dark fuscous, variegated with black.

References

External links 
 
 
 
 

Caradrinini
Moths of North America
Moths of the Caribbean
Moths of Central America
Moths of South America
Moths of Oceania
Moths of Cuba
Moths of Guadeloupe
Lepidoptera of Brazil
Lepidoptera of Jamaica
Insects of Hawaii